Philip Seeman,  (8 February 1934 – 9 January 2021) was a Canadian schizophrenia researcher and neuropharmacologist, known for his research on dopamine receptors.

Career
Born in Winnipeg, Manitoba, Seeman was raised in Montreal. He received a Bachelor of Science degree, honours physics & physiology (1955), a Master of Science degree, physiology of transport & secretion (1956), and a Doctor of Medicine (1960) from McGill University. In 1966, he received a Ph.D. in life sciences from Rockefeller University.

In 1967, Seeman became an assistant professor in the Department of Pharmacology at the University of Toronto. In 1970, he was appointed a professor.

In 1974, having spent years in search of the binding site of antipsychotic medication, he discovered the dopamine D2 receptor, the basis for the dopamine hypothesis of schizophrenia.

In 2001, he was made an Officer of the Order of Canada "for his research on dopamine receptors and their involvement in diseases such as schizophrenia, Parkinson's and Huntington's".

In 1985, he was made a Fellow of the Royal Society of Canada.

He was married to Dr. Mary V. Seeman.

Notes

References 

 
 
 P. Seeman (2010). "Dopamine D2 Receptors as Treatment Targets in Schizophrenia. Clinical Schizophrenia & Related Psychoses April: 56-73.
 P. Seeman (2007), Scholarpedia, 2(10): 3634    doi.4249/scholarpedia.3634

External links 
 Home Page of Philip Seeman's Laboratory
 Probing the Biology of Psychosis, Schizophrenia, and Antipsychotics: An Expert Interview With Dr. Philip Seeman, MD, PhD – an interview on the Medscape website
 Schizophrenia – an essay by Philip Seeman, November 2001

1934 births
2021 deaths
Canadian pharmacologists
Fellows of the Royal Society of Canada
Officers of the Order of Canada
People from Winnipeg
Schizophrenia researchers
Neuropharmacologists
Canadian neuroscientists